is a Japanese light novel series written by Atsushi Kagurazaka and illustrated by Sadaji Koike. Tokuma Shoten published four novels from April 2007 to June 2010. It has been adapted into a drama CD, a manga series serialized in Monthly Comic Ryū, and an anime television series animated by J.C.Staff aired between July and September 2009. The anime had been licensed in North America by Sentai Filmworks and Section23 Films released the complete collection on November 16, 2010.

Story
In 1925, after being told by a baseball player that women should become housewives instead of going to school, two 14-year-old Japanese high school girls named Koume and Akiko decide to start a baseball team in order to prove him wrong. During this time, when even running was considered too vulgar for women, baseball is known as "what the boys do" and they face many difficulties when having to find enough members, to get permission from their parents and also when learning about the sport itself.

The first book in the series opens in Taishō 14 (1925), introducing Koume, who is the 14-year-old daughter of a yōshoku restaurant owner, and a student at a local girls' academy. One day, Koume's friend, Akiko, asks her to join in an all-girl baseball team and have a match against a boys team. While the first volume can be read as a stand-alone work, the second volume develops the storyline further.

The second book is set in the summer of Taishō 14. Koume, Akiko, Manoe and the rest of the nine members of the Baseball Girls continue to face off against numerous all-boy teams, and have trouble dealing with the fast balls thrown by the boys. To combat the anxiety they experience, playing against more experienced teams, they decide to abandon their traditional baseball uniforms in favor of a kimono-style uniform. The girls also partition off the batter's box so that other teams cannot see what they are doing.

Apart from baseball, the series also deals with certain cultural changes that are not seen quite so often in anime. For example, the popular "sailor" school uniforms, now a staple of real-world Japanese schools, as well as school-based anime and manga, are only just being introduced into Japanese society during the Taishō period in which this work is based.

Characters

Main characters
The main characters are the members of the girls' baseball team Ouka-kai. Most of the girls are from class 1–2 and the team's coach is their homeroom teacher.
  The main protagonist of story, second member and catcher of team. She is the daughter of a yōshoku restaurant owner. Her dream is to wear a sailor uniform.
  Koume's closest friend, captain and pitcher of the team. She is from a wealthy family.
  Class president and childhood friend of Tamaki. She and Tamaki played baseball with boys when they were in elementary school. She is third/fourth team member: she spoke with Koume about their baseball team in the evening, but Koume didn't recognize her desire, and so Yuki repeated her request on the following day again (after Noe). She supplied first baseball equipment for the team (catcher mask, several gloves and balls) and also "stole" first team uniforms (western-like sport uniform) from her family kimono shop (it was too modern, so it didn't sell and was kept in storage).
  Third/fourth member and main strategist/tactician of the team.
  Fifth member and Shizuka's elder twin sister. She has a huge crush on Koume and joined the team to be closer to her. Before the baseball team, she was in the newspaper club. She is very athletic and her dream is to hit a home run. Unlike her twin, she wears a sailor uniform for school. She shares a room with her twin in the school dorms.
  Sixth member and Tomoe's younger twin sister. Before the baseball team, she was also in the newspaper club. Unlike her twin, she normally dresses in traditional Japanese clothing.
  Seventh-eighth member. She has a large crush on Tomoe, and when Tomoe asked her to join – she agreed without thinking.
  Ninth member. Yuki's childhood friend. Initially she was the most skilled player in team.
  Noriko's replacement. Before the baseball team she was on the track team.
  She is the English language teacher, class 2–1 homeroom teacher and the girls' coach.

Others
  The newspaper club president. Initially she was seventh-eighth member (she was forced to join by Tomoe because she owed her money), lately she retired from the team, but she stays their fan.
  A young man who's a promising chef and works in the Suzukawa's restaurant. He becomes Koume's fiancé through arranged marriage in the middle of the anime.
  Akiko's arranged finance. He held chauvinistic views believing women belonged only in domestic roles prompting Akiko to take up baseball. He changes after playing against her.
  One of Iwasaki's fellow baseball players, due to a misunderstanding he self-proclaims himself Koume's boyfriend henceforth becoming extremely rude and pushy about it.

Media

Anime
An anime television series adaptation animated by J.C.Staff was announced in August 2008 and aired for 12 episodes on TBS from July 2 to September 24, 2009, replacing K-On! in its timeslot. It was written and directed by Takashi Ikehata with character designs by Kanetoshi Kamimoto, who is known for his design work for Tomy toys. The anime was licensed in North America by Sentai Filmworks and the complete collection was released on November 16, 2010.

Drama CD

Audio CD, 72 minutes, 7 tracks, Frontier Works, FCCN-0032, 21 December 2007.

Manga
A manga series by Shimpei Itoh was published in Monthly Comic Ryū from July 19, 2008, to February 19, 2011 and collected into five volumes.

Novels

221 pages, April 17, 2007, Tokuma Shoten

202 pages, August 20, 2008, Tokuma Shoten

212 pages, July 2009, Tokuma Shoten

 224 pages, June 17, 2010, Tokuma Shoten

References

External links
 大正野球娘。at Comic Ryu (official site)
 Official anime site (at TBS)

2007 Japanese novels
2008 manga
2010 video games
Anime and manga based on light novels
Baseball in anime and manga
Baseball novels
J.C.Staff
Japan-exclusive video games
Light novels
PlayStation Portable games
PlayStation Portable-only games
Seinen manga
Sentai Filmworks
Suzak Inc. games
Taishō period in fiction
TBS Television (Japan) original programming
Tokuma Shoten manga
Video games based on anime and manga
Video games developed in Japan
Women's baseball
Works about women's sports